John Lewis Rawls Jr. (December 7, 1923 – April 25, 1994) was an American attorney and politician who served as a member of the Virginia Senate and House of Delegates.

References

External links 
 
 

1923 births
1994 deaths
Democratic Party Virginia state senators
20th-century American politicians